Parapercis fuscolineata is a fish species in the sandperch family, Pinguipedidae. It is found in  the Philippines.  
This species can reach a length of  TL.

References

Notes

Sources
Randall, J.E., 2001. Pinguipedidae (= Parapercidae, Mugiloididae). Sandperches. p. 3501-3510. In K.E. Carpenter and V. Niem (eds.) FAO species identification guide for fishery purposes. The living marine resources of the Western Central Pacific. Vol. 6. Bony fishes part 4 (Labridae to Latimeriidae), estuarine crocodiles. FAO, Rome.

Pinguipedidae
Taxa named by Pierre Fourmanoir
Fish described in 1985